Barindra Nath Koley was an Indian politician. He was a peasant leader and a member of Communist Party of India (Marxist). He represented Amta Assembly constituency from 1977 to 1996. He was a teacher of history in Baneswarpur Ramchandrapur Anulia United High School in Amta I.

Electoral performance

1972

1977

1982

1987

1991

References

People from Howrah district
Communist Party of India (Marxist) politicians from West Bengal
20th-century Indian politicians
West Bengal MLAs 1972–1977
West Bengal MLAs 1977–1982
West Bengal MLAs 1982–1987
West Bengal MLAs 1987–1991
West Bengal MLAs 1991–1996